Cyperus trisulcus is a species of sedge that is native to central parts of Nepal.

See also 
 List of Cyperus species

References 

trisulcus
Plants described in 1825
Flora of Nepal
Taxa named by David Don